The Karnival Kid is a 1929 Mickey Mouse short animated film released by Celebrity Productions, as part of the Mickey Mouse film series. It was directed by Walt Disney and animated by Ub Iwerks, with music by Carl W. Stalling. It was the ninth Mickey Mouse short to be produced, the sixth of that year.

The short was produced in black and white by The Walt Disney Studio and released to theaters by Celebrity Productions. It is the ninth film in the Mickey Mouse film series, and the first in which Mickey speaks. (During his first eight appearances Mickey whistled, laughed, cried and otherwise vocally expressed himself.) Mickey's first spoken line is "Hot dogs! Hot dogs!", the voice being provided by composer Carl W. Stalling instead of Walt Disney. This would later serve as a basis for Mickey's later catchphrase "Hot dog!"

Three other recurring characters of the series also appear. The first is Clarabelle Cow in a cameo. The second is a carnival barker -- "a direct forerunner, in both looks and behavior, of the later comics character Kat Nipp." The third is Mickey's recurring love interest, Minnie Mouse.

Plot
The Karnival Kid is broken into two distinct segments. The first segment features Mickey selling hot dogs at a carnival. The second segment is set later that night and features Mickey, accompanied by two cats, in a moonlight serenade.

The short opens to the scene of a bustling carnival. After a few initial sight gags, the action quickly focuses on Kat Nipp, a barker at the carnival who is enticing a crowd to see Minnie, "the Shimmy Dancer."  Mickey stands nearby, selling hot dogs and taunting Nipp. Nipp briefly gets into a dispute with Mickey over a dancing doll scam. As the audience watches the off-screen dance, Mickey calls out "Hot dogs! Hot dogs!", his first spoken line. However, Minnie soon notices Mickey and calls him over to order a hot dog. She takes a coin out of her stocking to pay, but Mickey, who is clearly attracted to her, refuses to accept the coin and gives it to her for free.  When she bites into the hot dog, it screams and runs away.  Mickey catches it and spanks it, concluding the first segment.  Much of the humor in this segment comes from the interaction between Mickey and his hot dogs, with the latter tending to act like actual dogs in relation to their owner/trainer.

In the second segment, Mickey attempts to draw Minnie's attention by playing a guitar outside her window and singing "Sweet Adeline", joined by two alley cats who imitate the monotone delivery of vaudeville comedy team Shaw and Lee.  The sound delights Minnie but awakens an irate Kat Nipp, who had been resting in a nearby trailer.  Nipp starts throwing things at the three annoyances in an attempt to silence them.  The short ends as Mickey is hit with an entire bed and knocked dizzy.

Stalling's score for The Karnival Kid features two notable themes. During the "Shimmy Dance" sequence, a monkey, performing as a one-man band, plays the Snake Charmer song, the common name for The Streets of Cairo.  During the moonlight serenade segment, Mickey and the cats perform a rendition of the barbershop standard Sweet Adeline. Peg-Leg Pete later appears in a post-credits scene.

Production
This was the first cartoon in which Mickey speaks. Walt Disney was thrilled by the progress, but Pat Powers of Celebrity Pictures wasn't; he worried that Mickey speaking English would affect overseas sales of the cartoons.

In Mickey's Movies: The Theatrical Films of Mickey Mouse, Gijs Grob observes: "The Karnival Kid shows that lip synchronization was far more difficult to master than synchronized sound itself. The animation of the mouth to form syllables was a totally new feat, and initially it was done all too literally. This led to awkward facial expressions at times, with especially Mickey's face distorting into a multitude of mouth gestures. The problem would become even worse in Mickey's next cartoon, Mickey's Follies."

The hot dog gags are reused from an earlier film, Disney's 1927 Oswald the Lucky Rabbit short All Wet.

Legacy and influence
Mickey's first words later inspired the "Hot Dog" song from Mickey Mouse Clubhouse.

The scene where Mickey tips his ears to Minnie inspired storyman Roy Williams to invent the Mickey Mouse ears hat.

Ub Iwerks reused elements of the plot and many of the visual gags from The Karnival Kid in his 1932 cartoon, Circus. The part of the hot dog vendor is played by Flip the Frog.

New York Weenie, an episode from the 2013 Mickey Mouse shorts series, shares similar themes and gags with The Karnival Kid. The episode was directed by Aaron Springer, most notable for his work on SpongeBob SquarePants.

Artist Bruce Conner included the final shot in his film "3 Screen Ray".

An LCD Game & Watch-styled mini-game based on the short appears in the 2019 video game Kingdom Hearts III.

Voice cast
 Mickey Mouse: Carl W. Stalling
 Minnie Mouse: Walt Disney
 Barker: Walt Disney
 Singing cats: Carl W. Stalling

Reception
The Film Daily (September 1, 1929): "Very Good: Mickey Mouse does his cartoonatics as a hot dog vendor at the circus grounds. The hot dogs come to life and the cartoonist gets a series of clever and funny gags that will make anybody laugh. Winds up with a serenade by two cats assisting Mickey win his gal. Clever, in the way that this series has grown to have a habit of being quite consistently."

Home media
The short was released on December 2, 2002 on Walt Disney Treasures: Mickey Mouse in Black and White.

See also
Mickey Mouse (film series)

References

External links
 

1920s Disney animated short films
1929 short films
1929 animated films
1929 comedy films
Mickey Mouse short films
American black-and-white films
1920s American animated films
Films directed by Walt Disney
Films directed by Ub Iwerks
Films produced by Walt Disney
Films scored by Carl Stalling
Circus films
1920s English-language films
American animated short films
Animated films about mice